Laguiole (La Guiòla  in Languedocien) is a commune in the Aveyron department in southern France.

It is known for its Laguiole cheese, which has an Appellation d'Origine Contrôlée (label of guaranteed origin), and as the birthplace of the Laguiole knife. The name of the village comes from la gleisòla, meaning a little church.

Population

See also
Communes of the Aveyron department

Tourism and accommodations
 Coutellerie de Laguiole Honoré Durand
 Coopérative Laitière de Laguiole
 Campsite La Romiguiere
 Vent d'Aubrac

References

Communes of Aveyron
Rouergue
Aveyron communes articles needing translation from French Wikipedia